Mamadou Diallo (born 1 August 1941) is a Guinean judoka. He competed in the men's half-lightweight event at the 1980 Summer Olympics.

References

1941 births
Living people
Guinean male judoka
Olympic judoka of Guinea
Judoka at the 1980 Summer Olympics
Place of birth missing (living people)